Komola Rocket (The Orange Ship) is a 2018 Bangladeshi Bengali language drama film, written and directed by Noor Imran Mithu. The film based on two short stories Moulik and Saipras written by Shahaduz Zaman. The film produced by Faridur Reza Sagar and Impress Telefilm Limited, and distributed by Impress Telefilm Limited. Starring Tauquir Ahmed, Mosharraf Karim, Joy Raj, Samia Said, Fariha Shams Sheuti and Dominic Gomes in the lead roles. It is one of the two Bangladeshi films (No Bed of Roses) that has premiered on Netflix yet.

Plot
The story of an eventful steamer ride, which shows a canvasser Mofizul (Mosharraf Karim), and a garments factory owner Atik (Tauquir Ahmed), who is trying to disappear after burning down his factory to claim the money from insurance company. Where another passenger Monsur, boards the steamer with the body of his wife, who died in that fire. The first class passengers don't mix with the other classes until the launch is stuck in shallow water for two nights, and shortage of food supply brings Atik down to Monsur's cabin.

Cast
 Tauquir Ahmed as Atik, garments factory owner
 Mosharraf Karim as Mofizul, canvasser 
 Joy Raj as Monsur, husband of the dead body
 Samia Said as Dishi, young lady, Ayesha's sister
 Fariha Shams Sheuti as Ayesha, Matin's wife and Dishi's sister
 Dominic Gomes as Matin, Ayesha's husband
 Abu Raihan Rasel as Job seekers
 Bappa Shantonu
 Shujat Shimul
 Shadullah Sobuj

Soundtrack

Release
The film is the third film from Bangladesh which saw its release on Netflix.

Receptions
The film won Best Debut Film at the 4th Jaffna International Cinema Festival in Sri Lanka, Jury Prize at the Festival du Film d'Asie du Sud  in France, and the Hiralal Sen Padak at the Amar Bhashar Cholochitra in Bangladesh. It also conquered by winning the Jury Awards at Nepal International Film Festival, and Sharm El-Sheikh Film Festival in Egypt.

References

External links
 
 
 
 

2018 films
Films scored by Imran Mahmudul
2010s Bengali-language films
Bengali-language Bangladeshi films
Bangladeshi drama films
Best Film Meril-Prothom Alo Critics Award winners
2018 drama films